Brenham is an unincorporated community in Kiowa County, Kansas, United States.

History
Brenham had a post office from 1884 until 1894.

Education
The community is served by Kiowa County USD 422 public school district.

References

Further reading

External links
 Kiowa County maps: Current, Historic, KDOT

Unincorporated communities in Kiowa County, Kansas
Unincorporated communities in Kansas